Xalil (also Khalil, Halil, Chelealeck; , pronounced ) (d. 1467) was the 3rd khan of the Kazan Khanate circa 1466–1467, but very little is known about him.  He was the eldest son of khan Maxmud (Mahmudek, Mäxmüd) and grandson of the first Khan of Kazan, Ulugh Muhammad. He spent his life entirely in Kazan. He ascended to the throne after his father's death. He was succeeded by his brother Ibrahim.

Reign

Xälil continued his father's policy of construction of Kazan cities.  Xälil was considered as an explosive and aggressive ruler. He was known for breaking the treaty with Duke-Prince Ivan III and poor relations with the Nogais. He later re-established ties with the Nogais upon marriage with Nur Sultan, daughter of Nogai Timur Mirza.

In Russian chronicles, the name Xälil is not mentioned at all. However, his name is mentioned in the work of the traveler of the 16th century Sigismund von Herberstein "Notes on Muscovite Affairs" (Rerum Moscoviticarum Commentarii). Also, Karl Fuchs in his work of 1817, using the ancient Tatar list of Kazan khans, mentions the name Xälil.  in his works, stated: 
The same information can be found in the works of Şihabetdin Märcani.

The young Khan was married to the daughter of Nogai Timur, Nur-Sultan who was from the Nogais. The marriage ended without an heir because Xälil died the following year.

Death
After his death in 1467, Nur-Sultan married Xälil's younger brother and heir Ibrahim. She gave birth to Ibrahim's sons and future Khans: Möxämmädämin (r. 1484–1485, 1487–1495, 1502–1518) and Ghabdellatif (r. 1496-1502). After Ibrahim died in 1479, Nur-Sultan married the Crimean Khan Meñli I Giray, her third husband.

According to one version, Xälil died in prison, where he had ended up due to fresh hostilities between the Kazan Khanate and the Golden Horde.

Xälil was buried in the Khan's Mausoleum in the Kazan Kremlin.

References
Howorth, Henry Hoyle. "History of the Mongols, from the 9th to the 19th Century. Part II, division I". The so-called tartars of Russia and Central Asia. Londres: Longmans, Green and Co, 1880.
 M. G. Khudyakov: Essays on the History of Kazan Khanate
Xälil Xan.

See also
List of Kazan khans

1467 deaths
Khanate of Kazan
15th-century monarchs in Europe
Year of birth unknown